Carmela Schmidt (born 16 May 1962 in Halle an der Saale) is a former freestyle swimmer from East Germany.

She won two bronze medals at the boycotted 1980 Summer Olympics in Moscow, USSR. Schmidt also won the world title in the 1982 World Aquatics Championships, in the 400 m freestyle.

See also
 List of Olympic medalists in swimming (women)
 List of World Aquatics Championships medalists in swimming (women)

References
databaseOlympics

1962 births
Living people
German female swimmers
East German female freestyle swimmers
Swimmers at the 1980 Summer Olympics
Olympic swimmers of East Germany
Olympic bronze medalists for East Germany
Sportspeople from Halle (Saale)
Olympic bronze medalists in swimming
Medalists at the 1980 Summer Olympics
World Aquatics Championships medalists in swimming
European Aquatics Championships medalists in swimming
20th-century German women
21st-century German women